The Hackberry Ramblers (also known as the Riverside Ramblers), a Grammy Award-nominated Cajun music band based in Hackberry, Louisiana, formed in 1933. Since its heyday in the late 1930s it has become one of the most recognized names and influential groups in Cajun music.

The group, which continues to tour and perform, has one of the longest histories of a musical group in the United States of America, and while its lineup has changed many times since its conception, its founders — fiddler Luderin Darbone and accordionist Edwin Duhon — led the band until Duhon's death in 2006. (Darbone died November 21, 2008.) While the roots of the band lie in its Cajun music repertoire, the Ramblers perform a broad swath of American music, from Western swing to blues and rockabilly, and much of their sound blends them all.

Early years
In 1930 Luderin Darbone met a guitarist called Edwin Duhon and together they formed the nucleus of a band they named the Hackberry Ramblers in honor of their hometown. By 1933 they were on the radio and signed with RCA Bluebird Records. In 1936, they recorded "Jolie Blonde", "Oh Josephine, Ma Josephine", "One Step De L'Amour" and "Faux Pas Tu Bray Cherie". Darbone and Duhon were the first musicians to bring electronic amplification to area dance halls, running a public address system off the idling engine of Darbone's Model-A Ford.

The band performed at festivals, including FitzGerald's American Music Festival in 1997.

Their eclectic repertoire included Cajun music, country music and Western swing, jazz music, and blues music. Due to a sponsorship deal with Montgomery Ward, the band adopted the name "The Riverside Ramblers". In 2002, Darbone and Duhon received a prestigious National Heritage Fellowship from the Folk Arts Program of the National Endowment for the Arts.

The Country Music Hall of Fame has honored the group; it holds enshrined many of the founding members' instruments.

James "Glen" Croker
Croker died at the age of 77 on August 23, 2011.

Current members
Glen Croker - Electric guitar
Johnny Faulk - Upright bass
Ben Sandmel - Drums
John Parker - Upright bass

See also
History of Cajun Music
List of Notable People Related to Cajun Music

References

Other sources
 Musician Edwin Duhon dead at 95 United Press International, Inc. Retrieved 20 Mar 2006.
 Sandmel, Ben. "Cajun At The Country Music Hall Of Fame". ZydE-Zine. Retrieved 14 August 2005.
 John Wirt, "‘Hackberry Ramblers’ Co-Founder Dead [Luderin Darbone] at 95," The Advocate [Baton Rouge, La.], 23 November 2008, http://www.2theadvocate.com/news/34944819.html, accessed 1 December 2008.
 Luderin Darbone 1913-2008 Arhoolie Records.

American folk musical groups